Ellington Lee Ratliff (born April 14, 1993) is an American drummer and actor. He is best known as the drummer of pop rock band R5, which was active from 2009 until 2018, and as a contributor to The Driver Era.

Early life
Ellington Lee Ratliff was born on April 14, 1993, in Los Angeles, California, to Cheryl and George Ratliff. From his father's previous marriage, Ratliff has three half-brothers: Erick, Elden, and Garette.

Career

Acting 
In 2001, Ratliff made his acting debut in All You Need as Robbie Crenshaw. As a young adult, he appeared in episodes of television shows like Eastwick, Raising Hope, Nickelodeon's Victorious, and Red Scare as well as the 2012 film My Uncle Rafael. He and Ross Lynch of R5 were extras in the 2011 movie The Muppets. Ratliff appeared in the 2017 Criminal Minds "Red Light" as well as in a 2019 episode of Grown-ish.

Music 

In October 2009, Ratliff met the Lynch siblings at a dance studio in California.

Equipment
Ratliff uses dw drums and Paiste cymbals, favoring their 2002 series. He has also used Tama drums and Promark drumsticks.

Filmography

Television

Films

Discography

Extended plays

Singles

References

External links 
, the band's official website

1993 births
Living people
American drummers
Male actors from Los Angeles
Musicians from Los Angeles
R5 (band) members
21st-century American drummers